The Bertiaceae are a family of fungi in the Ascomycota, order Coronophorales.

References

External links

Coronophorales
Ascomycota families